The soundtrack album of the eighth season of HBO series Game of Thrones, titled Game of Thrones: Season 8, was released digitally on May 19, 2019, a double CD was released  July 19, 2019, and was released on vinyl later in the year.

Ramin Djawadi received his seventh Primetime Emmy Award nomination, for Outstanding Music Composition for a Series (Original Dramatic Score), for the season's third episode, "The Long Night" and then won the award, making two consecutive wins for Djawadi.

Background

"It's been such an honor to be a part of this incredible show for the past eight years", said Ramin Djawadi.

Djawadi says of his track "The Night King": "When I talked to Miguel [Sapochnik], the director, and when David [Benioff] and [D. B. Weiss] came to my studio and we started working on this episode, we all agreed that it had to be a piano piece again, just like 'Light of the Seven'.[...] It definitely misled the audience because of what they knew from 'Light of the Seven', back in season six. We always treated the music as another character in the show."

Track listing

Charts

References

2019 soundtrack albums
Soundtrack
Ramin Djawadi soundtracks
WaterTower Music soundtracks
Classical music soundtracks
Instrumental soundtracks
Television soundtracks